The Asia/Oceania Zone is one of the three zones of regional Davis Cup competition in 2014.

In the Asia/Oceania Zone there are four different groups in which teams compete against each other to advance to the next group.

Teams
 
  (promoted to Group II)
  (promoted to Group II)
 
  (relegated to Group IV)
 
 
  (relegated to Group IV)

Format
The eight teams will be split into two pools of four, the top two nations will advance to the promotion pool. The two best teams from there will be promoted. The bottom two teams will play in a relegation pool, where the two last teams will be relegated.

It will played on the week commencing 9 June 2014 at Tehran, Iran and it will be played on outdoor clay courts.

Group stage

Group A

Malaysia vs. Turkmenistan

Syria vs. Cambodia

Malaysia vs. Syria

Cambodia vs. Turkmenistan

Malaysia vs. Cambodia

Syria vs. Turkmenistan

Group B

Lebanon vs. Singapore

Iran vs. United Arab Emirates

Lebanon vs. Iran

United Arab Emirates vs. Singapore

Lebanon vs. United Arab Emirates

Iran vs. Singapore

Promotion play-off

Malaysia vs. Lebanon

Iran vs. Syria

Relegation play-off

Cambodia vs. Singapore

Turkmenistan vs. United Arab Emirates

References

External links

Asia Oceania Zone III
Davis Cup Asia/Oceania Zone